Captain Richard George Briscoe MC (15 August 1893 – 11 December 1957) was a British soldier and politician from Longstowe in Cambridgeshire. He was Conservative Member of Parliament (MP) for Cambridgeshire from 1923 to 1945.

He was born in Brewood, Staffordshire, the son of William Arthur Briscoe, of Longstowe Hall, Cambridgeshire. He was educated at Eton College and Magdalen College, Oxford. During the First World War, he served in the Grenadier Guards and was awarded the Military Cross for gallantry. He served again in the Second World War. He died suddenly in 1957 in London.

References

External links 
 

1893 births
1957 deaths
UK MPs 1923–1924
UK MPs 1924–1929
UK MPs 1929–1931
UK MPs 1931–1935
UK MPs 1935–1945
Conservative Party (UK) MPs for English constituencies
Grenadier Guards officers
People from South Cambridgeshire District
People educated at Eton College
Alumni of Magdalen College, Oxford